Aurora Township is an inactive township in Lawrence County, in the U.S. state of Missouri.

Aurora Township took its name from the community of Aurora, Missouri.

References

Townships in Missouri
Townships in Lawrence County, Missouri